Jim "Hawk" O'Brien was an Irish hurler who played as a goalkeeper for the Tipperary senior team.

Born in Thurles, County Tipperary, O'Brien first arrived on the inter-county scene when he first linked up with the Tipperary senior team. He made his senior debut during the 1904 championship. O'Brien went on to play a key role for the team over the next decade, and won two All-Ireland medals and three Munster medals. He was an All-Ireland runner-up on one occasion.

At club level O'Brien was a six-time championship medallist with Thurles.

His retirement came following the conclusion of the 1912 championship.

Honours

Team

Thurles
Tipperary Senior Club Hurling Championship (6) 1904, 1906, 1907, 1908, 1909, 1911

Tipperary
All-Ireland Senior Hurling Championship (2): 1906, 1908
Munster Senior Hurling Championship (3): 1906, 1908, 1909

References

1951 deaths
Thurles Sarsfields hurlers
Tipperary inter-county hurlers
All-Ireland Senior Hurling Championship winners
Hurling goalkeepers
Year of birth missing